The 2013 World Junior Table Tennis Championships were held in Rabat, Morocco, from 1 to 8 December 2013. It was organised by the Fédération Royale Marocaine de Tennis de Table (FRMTT) under the auspices and authority of the International Table Tennis Federation (ITTF).

Medal summary

Events

Medal table

See also
2013 World Table Tennis Championships

References

World Junior Table Tennis Championships
World Junior Table Tennis Championships
World Junior Table Tennis Championships
World Junior Table Tennis Championships
Table tennis in Morocco
International sports competitions hosted by Morocco
World Junior Table Tennis Championships